Ereğli Demir ve Çelik Fabrikaları T.A.Ş. is a Turkish steel producer.  The name is a contraction of the Turkish language Ereğli Demir ve Çelik Fabrikaları, which means "Ereğli Iron and Steel Factories". Erdemir occupies the 43rd place among the largest steel companies in the world and is also involved in coal in Turkey.

History
Erdemir, which began production in 1965, has a production capacity of 8.5  million tons/year of crude steel (2020 value). It is the largest iron and steel company in Turkey and was the only flat steel producer till January 2009. It produces plates, hot and cold rolled sheet and tinplate.

Erdemir operates a large seaport, the Port of Erdemir, to import and export materials.

Erdemir has Port of Erdemir also acquired the steel plant at İskenderun,  Hatay Province in southern Turkey.

Turkish Armed Forces Pension Fund (OYAK) acquired a 49.29% stake in Erdemir on 4 October 2005 for $2.77 billion in a televised auction. The fund acquired 46.12% from the Turkish Privatization Administration (OIB) and it was also obliged to purchase an additional 3.17% stake from a Turkish bank. OYAK beat out five other bidders for Erdemir. This included Mittal Steel, Arcelor, Novolipetsk Steel (NLMK) and Severstal, which bid in consortium with the Nurol-Limak-Ozaltin-Alkol Pazarlama joint venture group. The Eregli joint venture group also participated in the auction.

See history of Erdemir Group since 1954.

Pollution 
Erdemir burns coal in Turkey. As an integrated steelworks, emissions are higher than steel produced at electric arc furnaces. Climate Trace estimates the plant emitted 4.7 million tonnes of carbon dioxide in 2021, more greenhouse gas than any other steelmaker in the country except İsdemir.

Railway
Erdemir owns many railway tracks in its steel plant in Ereğli. The Ereğli–Armutçuk railway connects the plant with the town of Armutçuk. The tracks outside the plant are no longer used and when Turkish State Railways (TCDD) abandoned the line in 2006, Erdemir bought the tracks within the plant. Erdemir uses a chunter locomotive, the Erdemir L-5 series.

List of 50 Projects 
Turkish chamber of Civil engineers lists Erdemir as one of the fifty civil engineering feats in Turkey, a list of remarkable engineering projects realized after the declaration of Turkish republic.

See also
List of steel producers
List of companies of Turkey
Erdemir SK, Basketball club of Erdemir
Port of Erdemir

References

External links
Erdemir official web site
Official Web Site of OYAK

Companies listed on the Istanbul Stock Exchange
Steel companies of Turkey
Manufacturing companies established in 1967
Zonguldak Province
Port operating companies
Turkish companies established in 1967
Coal in Turkey
Blast furnaces in Turkey